Walter Masing (born 22 June 1915 in Petrograd — died 29 March 2004 in Erbach) was a German physicist and honorary president of the German Association for Quality. He promoted and sponsored the settlement of quality management in Germany.

1915 births
2004 deaths
Scientists from Saint Petersburg
Baltic-German people
Officers Crosses of the Order of Merit of the Federal Republic of Germany